Paris green (copper(II) acetate triarsenite or copper(II) acetoarsenite) is an arsenic-based organic pigment. As a green pigment it is also known as Schweinfurt green, emerald or Vienna green. It is a highly toxic emerald-green crystalline powder that has been used as a rodenticide and insecticide, and also as a pigment, despite its toxicity. It is also used as a blue colorant for fireworks. The color of Paris green is said to range from a pale blue green when very finely ground, to a deeper green when coarsely ground.

Preparation and structure

Paris green may be prepared by combining copper(II) acetate and arsenic trioxide.  The structure was confirmed by X-ray crystallography.

Invention 

It was invented as 'emerald green' in 1814 by two chemists, Russ and Sattler, at the Wilhelm Dye and White Lead Company of Schweinfurt, Bavaria. They were attempting to produce an improved pigment over Scheele's green, particularly so that it was longer-lasting and less susceptible to darkening around sulfides. When they published the recipe in 1822, its toxicity became obvious. Despite this, like Scheele's green, it continued to be involved in poisoning accidents.

Uses

Insecticide
In 1867, farmers in Illinois and Indiana found that Paris green was effective against the Colorado potato beetle, an aggressive agricultural pest. Despite concerns regarding the safety of using arsenic compounds on food crops, Paris green became the preferred method for controlling the beetle. By the 1880s, Paris green had become the first widespread use of a chemical insecticide in the world. It was also used widely in the Americas to control the tobacco budworm, Heliothis virescens.

Paris green was heavily sprayed by airplane in Italy, Sardinia, and Corsica during 1944 and in Italy in 1945 to control malaria. It was once used to kill rats in Parisian sewers, which is how it acquired its common name.

Pigment
Paris green, also called emerald green, was a popular pigment used in artists' paints by (among others) the English painter J. M. W. Turner, Impressionists such as Monet and Renoir, and Post-Impressionists such as Gauguin, Cézanne, and Van Gogh.

Related pigments
Similar natural compounds are the minerals chalcophyllite ·36, conichalcite , cornubite ·, cornwallite ·, and liroconite ·4. These vivid minerals range from greenish blue to slightly yellowish green.

Scheele's green is a chemically simpler, less brilliant, and less permanent, synthetic copper-arsenic pigment used for a rather short time before Paris green was first prepared, which was approximately 1814. It was popular as a wallpaper pigment and would degrade, with moisture and molds, to arsine gas. Paris green was also used in wallpaper to some extent and may have also degraded similarly. Both pigments were once used in printing ink formulations.

The ancient Romans used one of them, possibly conichalcite, as a green pigment. The Paris green paint used by the Impressionists is said to have been composed of relatively coarse particles. Later, the chemical was produced with increasingly small grinds and without carefully removing impurities; its permanence suffered. It is likely that it was ground more finely for use in watercolors and inks, too.

See also
 List of colors
 List of inorganic pigments

References

Further reading
 Fiedler, I. and Bayard, M. A., "Emerald Green and Scheele’s Green", in Artists' Pigments: A Handbook of Their History and Characteristics, Vol. 3: E.W. Fitzhugh (Ed.) Oxford University Press 1997, pp. 219–271
 
 
 Spear, Robert J., The Great Gypsy Moth War, A History of the First Campaign in Massachusetts to Eradicate the Gypsy Moth, 1890–1901. University of Massachusetts Press, Amherst and Boston, 2005.

External links
 Case Studies in Environmental Medicine - Arsenic Toxicity
 How Emerald green is made
 National Pollutant Inventory - Copper and compounds fact sheet
 Emerald green, Colourlex

Acetates
Arsenites
Copper(II) compounds
Inorganic insecticides
Organic pigments
Rodenticides
Shades of green